Beatrice d'Avesnes (died: 1321) was a daughter of Baldwin of Avesnes and his wife Felicitas of Coucy.  Baldwin was the son of Bouchard IV of Avesnes.

She married in 1265 Count Henry VI of Luxembourg and was the mother of:
 Henry VII (1274–1313), Count of Luxemburg, King of the Romans in 1308 and Emperor in 1312.
 Walram (d. 1311), Lord of Dourlers, Thirimont en Consorre
 Felicitas (d. 1336), married in 1298 John Tristan (d. 1309), Count of Leuven
 Baldwin (1285–1354), Archbishop of Trier (1307–1354)
 Margaret (d. 1336), a nun in Lille and in Marienthal.

References

Countesses of Luxembourg
Duchesses of Luxembourg
Avesnes family
Year of birth uncertain
1321 deaths
13th-century French women
13th-century French people
14th-century French women
14th-century French people